Variations in Blue is an album by saxophonist Bill Barron which was recorded in 1983 and first released on the Muse label.

Reception 

In his review on Allmusic, Scott Yanow stated "Bill Barron, who spent much of his life as a music educator, played inventive solos that sounded both spontaneous and well thought-out. Barron, who was underrated throughout his career, cut three records for Muse during 1978–1987, of which this set was the second".

Track listing 
All compositions by Bill Barron except where noted.
 "Variations in Blue" – 6:15
 "September 1979" – 7:09
 "Be Who You Are" – 7:03
 "The Name of This Is" – 7:44
 "Swingin' in Bushnell Park" – 9:10
 "Minority" (Basheer Qusim) – 6:36

Personnel 
Bill Barron – tenor saxophone
Jimmy Owens – trumpet
Kenny Barron – piano
Ray Drummond – bass
Ben Riley – drums

References 

1984 albums
Muse Records albums
Bill Barron (musician) albums